Robin Brockway (born 17 April 1981 in Shrewsbury) is a British actor.

Career 

Television appearances include The Bill for ITV, Holby City for the BBC and Dispatches for Channel 4.

Theatre work includes Frankie in A Lie of the Mind by Sam Shepard, Arthur Kipps in Half a Sixpence and the Scarecrow in the Wizard of Oz.

Trivia
 Great nephew of Fenner Brockway.

External links 
 Robin Brockway Official

1981 births
Living people
Actors from Shrewsbury
British male television actors
British male stage actors